The Tropic of Cancer Monument is a monument in Shuishang Village, Shuishang Township, Chiayi County, Taiwan.

History
The monument was originally built in 1908. The current building was completed in 1995.

Geography
The monument is located along the Tropic of Cancer line which cut across Taiwan.

See also
 List of tourist attractions in Taiwan

References

1995 establishments in Taiwan
Buildings and structures in Chiayi County
Monuments and memorials in Taiwan
Tourist attractions in Chiayi County